The Calvin A. Buffington House is a historic house located at Depot Street and Railroad Avenue in Berkshire, Tioga County, New York.

Description and history 
It is a two-story, frame pattern book house, built in 1909. Also on the property is a contributing frame garage and slate sidewalk. It was the home of Calvin A. Buffington, who patented a folding chair design that he manufactured in Berkshire until 1926.

It was listed on the National Register of Historic Places on July 2, 1984.

References

Houses on the National Register of Historic Places in New York (state)
Houses completed in 1909
Houses in Tioga County, New York
National Register of Historic Places in Tioga County, New York